Andrei Henadzevich Krasilnikau (born 25 April 1989 in Brest) is a Belarusian former professional cyclist, who rode professionally between 2011 and 2012, and from 2015 to 2018. During his career he would make an appearance at the UCI Road World Championships, competing in the time trial in 2012.

Major results

2007
 5th Time trial, UEC European Junior Road Championships
2008
 2nd  Time trial, World University Cycling Championships
 2nd Time trial, National Under-23 Road Championships
2009
 1st Stage 4 (ITT) Coupe des nations Ville Saguenay
 2nd Time trial, National Road Championships
 8th Overall Grand Prix Guillaume Tell
 9th Overall Tour de l'Avenir
2010
 2nd Time trial, National Road Championships
 9th Time trial, UCI Under-23 Road World Championships
2011
 2nd Overall Giro do Interior de São Paulo
2012
 2nd Time trial, National Road Championships
2013
 National Road Championships
1st  Road race
2nd Time trial
 7th Overall Giro della Regione Friuli Venezia Giulia
 10th Overall Tour des Pays de Savoie
2014
 9th Overall Tour des Pays de Savoie
2015
 National Road Championships
1st  Road race
3rd Time trial
 7th Grand Prix of ISD
 10th Horizon Park Classic

References

External links

1989 births
Living people
Belarusian male cyclists
Sportspeople from Brest, Belarus